Enamel orchid is a common name for several plants and may refer to:

 Caladenia brunonis, the purple enamel orchid
 Caladenia emarginata, the pink enamel orchid
 Elythranthera, commonly known as enamel orchids, a defunct genus, to which the above were formerly allocated